Çıkaran is a Moor-class mooring and salvage tug. Bow, McLachlan and Company of Paisley in Renfrewshire, Scotland built her for the Royal Navy, who commissioned her as HMDYC Moorstone in 1919. In 1948, she was decommissioned and in 1951, she was sold to civilian owners in Turkey, who renamed her Kurtaran. In 1962, she was sold again and her new owners named her Çıkaran. She was deleted from the register on 12 July 2010.

References

Ships built on the River Clyde
1919 ships
Tugboats of Turkey